SZNZ: Summer is the eighth EP by American rock band Weezer, and the second of four EPs in their SZNZ (pronounced "seasons") project. It was released digitally on June 21, 2022, coinciding with the Summer solstice. The EP received its lead single "Records" just a few days before its release.

Background 
Rivers Cuomo described the EP's sound as "21st century 90s". Aesthetically, he linked the project to 44 BC at the end of the Roman Republic, with an intended emotion of "youthful indignation".

Release 
On June 16, 2022, Weezer released the lead single, "Records", on an app called "Human Record Player". The app would play the song once the user spins themselves around clockwise like a record player. SZNZ: Summer was officially released on June 21, 2022, the day of the Summer Solstice.

Critical reception

Alex Hudson at Exclaim! opined that SZNZ: Summer is their heaviest release, surpassing Maladroit and Van Weezer, largely praising the EP. Hudson, however, added "The only real blunder is Summer's glossy, quantized, computer-made sound; with the raw energy of playing live in a room, Weezer's Summer pyrotechnics display might have truly ignited, rather than simply smouldered." David Gill of Riff Magazine was slightly more critical of the EP, stating "Cuomo's patented brand of plainspoken emotional vulnerability is still there, but the psychological urgency of The Blue Album and Pinkerton seems to have been replaced by a kind of ironic, almost vocational indifference. It's as if, 30 years after releasing some of the most intense and evocative emo rock ever made, Cuomo and Weezer now approach music as a problem to solve rather than a vehicle for their own catharsis." In a negative review, Jesse Locke of Pitchfork wrote: "At this point in their career, Weezer are the musical equivalent of The Simpsons. Hacky, pandering, and decades past their best work..."

Track listing

Personnel
Weezer
 Rivers Cuomo – lead vocals, guitars, backing vocals
 Brian Bell – guitars, backing vocals
 Patrick Wilson – drums
 Scott Shriner – bass, backing vocals

Additional personnel
 Robopop – production
 Suzy Shinn – additional production, vocal production
 Bernie Grundman – mastering
 Charlie Brand – engineering
 Andreas Sandnes – engineering assistance
 Sejo Navajas – engineering assistance

References

2022 EPs
Atlantic Records EPs
Heavy metal albums by American artists
Weezer EPs